The girdled wrasse, Notolabrus cinctus, is a species of wrasse native to the waters around the South Island and southeastern North Island of New Zealand, including the Chatham Islands and Snares Islands, where it can be found at depths from .  The males of this species can reach  in standard length, while the females only reach . There are two colour phases with older fish developing a large, dusky belt around the body. This is not associated with changing sex which happens about three years after the development of the belt. They feed on molluscs and small crustacea. They occur on rocky reefs, where they are common.

References

Notolabrus
Endemic marine fish of New Zealand
Taxa named by Frederick Hutton
Fish described in 1877